The 31st Army Corps was an Army corps in the Imperial Russian Army.

Part of
4th Army: 1914–1915
13th Army: 1915
3rd Army: 1915–1916
Russian Special Army: 1916

Reference 

Corps of the Russian Empire